William Nigel Ernle Bruce (4 February 1895 – 8 October 1953) was a British character actor on stage and screen. He was best known for his portrayal of Dr. Watson in a series of films and in the radio series The New Adventures of Sherlock Holmes (starring Basil Rathbone as Sherlock Holmes). Bruce is also remembered for his roles in the Alfred Hitchcock films Rebecca and Suspicion, as well as the Charlie Chaplin film Limelight.

Early life

Bruce was the second son of Sir William Waller Bruce, 10th Baronet and his wife Angelica Lady Bruce, daughter of General George Selby, Royal Artillery. He was born in Ensenada, Baja California, Mexico, whilst his parents were touring the world. His older brother was the author and adventurer Sir Michael Bruce.

He received his formal education at The Grange School in Stevenage, and from 1908 to 1912 at Abingdon School in Abingdon-on-Thames. At Abingdon he was a keen sportsman, playing for the first XI cricket team (for which he received Colours), the athletics' first team and the school's football 2nd XI.

In 1912, Bruce left school at the age of 17, and took up a position as a stockbroker's clerk in the City of London. In early 1914, whilst working in the City he voluntarily enlisted into the British Army's Territorial Force as an infantry soldier with the Honourable Artillery Company as its Private #852. On the outbreak of World War I in early August 1914, he was mobilized with the regiment, and went out to the Western Front with its 1st Battalion on 18 September 1914 at the age of 19. On 5 January 1915, whilst in trenches at Kemmel in Belgium, he was machine-gunned in the legs, causing multiple wounds and a fractured right thigh, and was subsequently medically evacuated to the United Kingdom, where he spent the rest of 1915 recovering in hospital. He was discharged from the British Army as medically unfit for further military service due to permanent damage to his legs in December 1915. In October 1916, he re-enlisted with the British Army and received training with an Officer Cadet Battalion in Cambridge, subsequently receiving a commission in January 1917, as a subaltern with the 10th (Service) Battalion, of the Somerset Light Infantry Regiment, a home service battalion, with which he served as a training officer for the rest of 1917, the permanent infirmity of his 1915 wounds preventing further active service at the front.

Career
After being discharged from the British Army, Bruce abandoned a career in the City of London Stock Exchange, and pursued a career as a professional actor. He made his stage debut on 12 May 1920 at London's Comedy Theatre as a footman in the play Why Marry?. In October of that year, he went to Canada as stage manager to Henry V. Esmond and Eva Moore, also playing "Montague Jordan" in Eliza Comes to Stay. Upon returning to England, he toured in the same role. He appeared regularly on-stage thereafter, and 8 years later began working in silent films. In 1926 he made his Broadway debut as Major Evelyn Bathurst in Noël Coward This Was a Man. He returned to Broadway several times during the 1930s, portraying Philip Downes in Ronald Jeans's Lean Harvest (1931), Mr. Jelliwell in Benn W. Levy's Springtime for Henry (1931–1932), His Excellency, Governor of the Colony in Arthur Schwartz's Virginia (1937), and William Schwenk Gilbert in Oscar Hammerstein II's Knights of Song (1938).

In 1934, he moved to Hollywood, U.S., as his career there became a success he set up a home at 701 North Alpine Drive, Beverly Hills in the latter half of the 1930s.

Bruce typically played buffoonish, fuzzy-minded gentlemen. During his film career, he worked in 78 films, including Treasure Island (1934), The Charge of the Light Brigade  (1936), Rebecca (1940), and Suspicion (1941).

He appeared in two landmark films: Becky Sharp (1935), the first feature film in full Technicolor, and Bwana Devil (1952), the first 3-D feature. He uncharacteristically played a detestable figure in The Rains Came (1939) which became the first film to win an Oscar for special effects.

Dr Watson

Bruce's career signature role was that of Dr Watson in the 1939–1946 Sherlock Holmes film series, alongside his friend Basil Rathbone playing Holmes. Bruce starred as Watson in all 14 films of the series, and over 200 radio programs of The New Adventures of Sherlock Holmes. Although Watson often appears to be the older of the two main characters, Bruce was three years younger than Rathbone.

Though for most viewers Nigel Bruce formed their vision of Dr Watson, Holmes purists have long objected that the Watson of the books was intelligent and capable (although not an outstanding detective), and that Bruce's portrayal made Watson intellectually dimmer and more bumbling than the literary figure. (A nickname resulting from this portrayal was "Boobus Britannicus".) Loren D. Estleman wrote of Bruce: Rathbone, however, spoke highly of Bruce's portrayal, saying that Watson was one of the screen's most lovable characters. The historian David Parkinson wrote that Bruce's "avuncular presence provided the perfect counterbalance to Rathbone's briskly omniscient sleuth". Historian Alan Barnes notes that, despite the criticisms against him, Bruce rehabilitated Watson, who had been a marginal figure in the cinematic Holmes canon to that point: "after Bruce, it would be a near-unthinkable heresy to show Holmes without him". The Rathbone-Bruce co-star film series lapsed with the death of its producer-director Roy William Neill in 1946. Since then, most major modern adaptations of Arthur Conan Doyle's Sherlock Holmes stories, especially since the 1970s, have consciously defied the popular stereotype, and depicted Watson faithfully as a capable man of action.

Family
Bruce was married, from 1921 until his death, to British actress Violet Campbell (née Violet Pauline Shelton) whom he always lovingly called "Bunny"; they had two daughters:
 Jennifer, married in 1944 (divorced in 1946) Jay Gould III, son of Jay Gould II; 
 Pauline, married in 1946 the British flying ace Alan Geoffrey Page.

Later life
 
Bruce, known as "Willie" to his friends, was a leading member of the British film colony in Los Angeles, and was captain of the (mostly British) Hollywood Cricket Club. Unlike some of his contemporaries, and along with other British actors such as Basil Rathbone and Charlie Chaplin, Bruce maintained his British citizenship, despite long residence in the United States. He also retained his membership of London's Garrick Club and Buck's Club until his death. His final film, World for Ransom, was released posthumously in 1954.

Death
Bruce died of a heart attack, in Santa Monica, California in 1953 at the age of 58. His body was subsequently cremated, with his ashes being placed in a niche at the Chapel of the Pines Crematory in Los Angeles.

In 1947 he began writing an autobiography entitled Games, Gossip and Greasepaint, which is unpublished; however, excerpts have been printed in the Sherlock Holmes Journal, and these have been posted online with permission.

Filmography

See also
 List of Old Abingdonians

Citations

General sources

Further reading

External links

 
 
 
 Extracts from Bruce's memoirs: 'Games Gossip and Greasepaint'

1895 births
1953 deaths
Military personnel from Baja California
20th-century British male actors
British Army personnel of World War I
British male film actors
British male radio actors
British male stage actors
British male television actors
Burials at Chapel of the Pines Crematory
Ernle family
Honourable Artillery Company soldiers
People educated at Abingdon School
Male actors from Baja California
People from Ensenada, Baja California
Somerset Light Infantry officers
Younger sons of baronets
British expatriate male actors in the United States